Altimeter setting is the value of the atmospheric pressure used to adjust the sub-scale of a pressure altimeter so that it indicates the height of an aircraft above a known reference surface.

The setting of a sensitive pressure altimeter is shown in the Kollsman window.

The altimeter setting QNH is one of the data included in METAR messages from weather stations in addition to the surface pressure. An alternative setting is QFE:
QNH is the barometric altimeter setting that causes an altimeter to read airfield elevation above mean sea level when on the airfield. In ISA temperature conditions the altimeter will read altitude above mean sea level in the vicinity of the airfield.
QFE is the barometric altimeter setting that causes an altimeter to read zero when at the reference datum of a particular airfield (in practice, the reference datum is either an airfield center or a runway threshold). In ISA temperature conditions the altimeter will read height above the airfield/runway threshold in the vicinity of the airfield.

QNH and QFE are arbitrary Q codes rather than abbreviations, but the mnemonics "nautical height" (for QNH) and "field elevation" (for QFE) are often used by pilots to distinguish between them.

References 

Aviation meteorology